Brian Burke (August 22, 1935) is an American former college football player and coach. He served as the head football coach at Ohio University from 1979 to 1984, compiling a record of 31–34–1.  He played college football at Kent State University from 1955 to 1957. Prior to being named head coach at Ohio, Burke was an assistant coach at the College of William & Mary, North Carolina State University, and the University of Virginia.

Head coaching record

References

1935 births
Living people
American football quarterbacks
Kent State Golden Flashes football players
NC State Wolfpack football coaches
Ohio Bobcats football coaches
Virginia Cavaliers football coaches
William & Mary Tribe football coaches